St John the Evangelist Church is one of four parish churches in the town of Newbury in the English county of Berkshire.

History 
In 1859 the parish of Saint John was founded and in 1860 was consecrated by the Bishop of Oxford. A church designed by William Butterfield was built, which served the parish until 10 February 1943, when it was destroyed in a German air raid.

After the war, money was raised to build a new church. Designed by Stephen Dykes Bower, it incorporates glass salvaged from the old church and over 750,000 hand-made bricks. Dating from 1955, the sanctuary windows are by AE Buss of Goddard & Gibbs.

The church is Grade II listed.

References

External links 

Church of England church buildings in Berkshire
Evangelicalism in the Church of England
Diocese of Oxford
Buildings and structures in Newbury, Berkshire
Rebuilt churches in the United Kingdom
20th-century Church of England church buildings